Jonas Stark (born 27 April 1972 in Gävle) is a Swedish former football defender.

Honours
Hammarby
Allsvenskan (1): 2001

References

External links
  
 

1972 births
Living people
Swedish footballers
Allsvenskan players
Superettan players
Hammarby Fotboll players
Gefle IF players
Association football defenders
People from Gävle
Sportspeople from Gävleborg County